Dolichianus of Jerusalem was Bishop of Jerusalem in early Christianity. He served during the rule of Commodus about 180AD.

References

2nd-century bishops of Jerusalem
2nd-century Romans
Year of birth unknown